The Devil Without a Cause Tour was a concert tour for American rapper and singer Kid Rock. After more than 10 years of being in the music industry his album Devil Without a Cause gave him his breakthrough, He also performed at Woodstock '99 as part of the tour.

The tour was broken up in 4 different tours including the Devil Without a Cause Tour, the White Trash on Dope Tour, the Destroy Your Liver Tour, and the Between The Legs Tour.

The Main Tour was also a mix with Limp Bizkit's Limptropolis Tour

Setlist 

{{hidden|header=White Trash On Dope Tour|content=
"Devil Without a Cause"
"Bawitdaba"
"3 Sheets to the Wind (What's My Name)"
"Welcome 2 the Party (Ode 2 the Old School)"
"I Am the Bullgod"
"Balls in Your Mouth"
"Fuck You Blind"
"A Country Boy Can Survive"
"My Name is Rock"
"Wasting Time"
"Prodigal Son"
"Somebody's Gotta Feel This"
"Fist of Rage"
"Yo-Da-Lin in the Valley"
"Can't You See"
"Cowboy"
Encore
"Where U At Rock"
"Fuck Off"
|headercss=background: #FFFF04; font-size: 100%; width: 59%;|contentcss=text-align: left; font-size: 100%; width: 75%;}}{{hidden|header=Destroy Your Liver Tour|content=
"Devil Without a Cause"
"3 Sheets to the Wind (What's My Name)"
"Welcome 2 the Party (Ode 2 the Old School)"
"I Am the Bullgod"
"Balls in Your Mouth"
"My Name is Rock"
"Somebody's Gotta Feel This"
"Fist of Rage"
"I Got One for Ya'"
"Wax The Booty"
"Wasting Time"
"Cowboy"
"Sister Anne/We're an American Band/Ramblin' Gamblin' Man/Stranglehold/My Name Is"
"Bawitdaba"
Encore
"Where U At Rock"
"Black Chick, White Guy"
"Only God Knows Why"
"Fuck Off"
|headercss=background: #FFFF00; font-size: 100%; width: 59%;|contentcss=text-align: left; font-size: 100%; width: 75%;}}

Personnel 
Kid Rock – lead vocals
Joe C. – co-vocals
Jason Krause – guitar
Kenny Olson – guitar
Uncle Kracker – turntables, background vocals
Jimmie Bones – keyboard, organ, piano, synth bass
Michael Bradford – Bass (Joined during the Between the Legs Tour)
Stefanie Eulinberg – drums, percussion

Tour dates

Notes

References 

1999 concert tours
1998 concert tours
Concert tours of North America
Concert tours of Europe
Concert tours